Petr Korda and Wally Masur were the defending champions but they competed with different partners that year, Korda with Jim Pugh and Masur with Mark Kratzmann.

Korda and Pugh lost in the first round to Mark Knowles and Alex O'Brien.

Kratzmann and Masur lost in the quarterfinals to Stefan Edberg and John McEnroe.

Kelly Jones and Rick Leach won in the final 7–6, 6–7, 6–2 against Patrick McEnroe and Rick Leach.

Seeds
Champion seeds are indicated in bold text while text in italics indicates the round in which those seeds were eliminated. The top four seeded teams received byes into the second round.

Draw

Final

Top half

Bottom half

External links
 1992 Volvo International Doubles Draw

Doubles